Li Yuan (born 29 May 2000) is a Chinese basketball player for Shandong Six Stars and the Chinese national team.

She participated at the 2018 FIBA Women's Basketball World Cup.

References

External links

2000 births
Living people
Chinese women's basketball players
Guards (basketball)
Sportspeople from Yantai
Asian Games medalists in basketball
Basketball players at the 2018 Asian Games
Asian Games gold medalists for China
Medalists at the 2018 Asian Games
Shandong Six Stars players
Basketball players from Shandong
Basketball players at the 2020 Summer Olympics
Olympic basketball players of China